The Elster Viaduct is a railway bridge in the German state of Saxony. It carries the Leipzig–Hof line near Jocketa over the valley of the White Elster. After the Göltzsch Viaduct (Göltzschtalbrücke) it is the second largest brick bridge in the world. The Elster Valley Railway passes under  the 68 metre-high bridge.

History 
The viaduct was built in the course of the construction of the Leipzig–Hof line of the Saxon-Bavarian State Railway (Sächsisch-Bayerische Staatseisenbahn). The foundation stone was laid on 7 November 1846. Up to 800 workers worked on the bridge from 1846 to 1851, laying 12 million bricks. In contrast to the Göltzsch Viaduct, which is only nine metres higher, it was built with normally shaped arches on only two levels. The lower level has five piers, four of which are built as double piers. The foundations of the piers and the deck were built out of slabs of granite.

In the last days of the Second World War on 16 April 1945 the German Wehrmacht partially demolished the bridge. This meant that trains from the southwest could only run as far as Röttis and from the northeast only as far as Jocketa. A temporary bridge was erected by attaching a steel truss to the remains of the demolished central supporting pier, which supported the girders of a timber bridge. This important bridge was reopened to traffic in February 1946. The final reconstruction of the two collapsed masonry brick arches was completed in October 1950.

The top of the lower arches carries a hiking trail. There are plaques on this level showing the reconstruction after the Second World War.

Specifications

References

See also
 List of bridges in Germany

External links

 
 

Bridges completed in 1851
Railway bridges in Germany
Arch bridges
Stone bridges in Germany
Transport in Saxony
Vogtland
Viaducts in Germany
1851 establishments in Germany
White Elster
Brick bridges